The tenth and final season of Australia's Next Top Model began airing on 20 September 2016 on Fox8. Head judge and host Jennifer Hawkins and judge Alex Perry returned along with model mentor Cheyenne Tozzi. Tozzi's co-mentor and former judge Didier Cohen left the show after season 9, and was replaced by the Stenmark twins, models Jordan and Zac Stenmark, as her new co-mentors. Model Megan Gale joined the judging panel as a permanent judge.

The prizes for this season included a one-year modelling contract with Priscilla's Model Management in Sydney, a trip to New York City for New York Fashion Week valued at 20,000 thanks to Colgate Optic White, a brand new Mazda2 Hatch, and an editorial spread in Elle Australia.

The winner of the competition was 16 year-old Aleyna FitzGerald from Manly, New South Wales.

Series summary

Requirements 
All applicants were required to be aged 16 and over on 1 January 2016 to be on the show. To qualify, all applicants had to be an Australian citizen currently living in Australia. Additional requirements stated that a contestant could not have had previous experience as a model in a national campaign within the last five years.

Auditions 
Auditions were held in Gold Coast on September 23, in Sydney on  September 25–26, in Melbourne on 30 September and 1 October, in Hobart on October 3 and in Perth in October 9. Applicants from Darwin, Dubbo, Port Macquarie and Townsville were also invited to auditions. Applicants were also encouraged to apply for the competition online if they were unable to make an appearance at the live auditions.

Guest judges
To celebrate the series' ten year anniversary, the show decided to invite several well known Australian models as guests for the new season. These included Elle Macpherson, Gemma Ward, and Miranda Kerr. The show also invited back several contestants from seasons past for guest appearances. Among these were season 7 winner Montana Cox and 2nd runner-up Simone Holtznagel, season 6 winner Amanda Ware, and season 5 runner-up Cassi Van Den Dungen. The series finale culminated with a runway show that invited several other alumni from multiple seasons of the show.

Cast

Contestants

(Ages stated are at start of contest)

Judges
 Jennifer Hawkins (host)
 Alex Perry
 Megan Gale

Other cast members
 Cheyenne Tozzi - mentor
 Jordan Stenmark - mentor
 Zac Stenmark - mentor

Episodes

Results

 The contestant was eliminated after her first time in the bottom two/three
 The contestant was eliminated after her second time in the bottom two/three
 The contestant was eliminated after her third time in the bottom two/three
 The contestant was eliminated in the semi-final judging and placed fourth
 The contestant was eliminated in the semi-final judging and placed third
 The contestant was eliminated in the final judging and placed as the runner-up

Score Table

 The contestant had the highest score
 The contestant had the lowest score and was eliminated
 The contestant had the second lowest score and was in the bottom 2
 The contestant had the highest score and won the competition

Average call-out order
Final two is not included.

Viewership

Notes

References

External links 
 

Australia's Next Top Model seasons
2016 Australian television seasons
Television shows filmed in Australia
Television shows filmed in Italy